Hajrudin "Hari" Varešanović (born 16 January 1961) is a Bosnian musician. Known for his impassioned lyrical tenor vocals, distinct stage presence and specific brand of poetic lyrics, Varešanović remains the vocal soloist, primary composer and lyricist for the musical group Hari Mata Hari.

Biography
Born as Hajrudin Varešanović in early 1961, in Sarajevo, Hari grew up in the Vratnik neighborhood of Sarajevo's old town. His grandfather, Mehaga Varešanović, was one of the more well-known singers of traditional Bosnian music called sevdalinka. At the age of six, Hajrudin began to sing and learned to play the guitar. At the local cultural center, he was asked to sing, then at the age of ten he sang with the group "Omi", and later for the group "Sedam šuma". In Vratnik, Hari recorded his first song "Zašto da ne uzmem nju". After finishing electrical school, Varešanović began to study Philosophy and attended classes of natural politics, but he never completed the courses. Music took up much of his time, as did his love of photography.

In 1979, Hari joined the group Zov with whom he recorded the hit song "Poletjela golubica sa Baščaršije." The song is still very popular. Next, Varešanović sang with the group "Ambasadori", with whom, it is said, that he matured into a professional artist. After his serving mandatory military service in the town of Niš, he appeared on the music scene by himself releasing the (1984) album Zlatne Kočije.

His professional career has lasted over a quarter of a century and he has performed at over 1,000 concerts. In 1999, Varešanović performed his song "Starac i More" in hope of representing Bosnia and Herzegovina at the Eurovision Song Contest 1999. However, after "Starac i More" had won it turned out the song had already been recorded, since Varešanović had sold the song to record label Unirecords in Finland, and Finnish artist Janne Hurme recorded that song in 1997 in name "Heart Blood" ("Sydänveri"). Hari Mata Hari was disqualified. The runner-up, Dino Merlin, was sent to the ESC instead.

In 1999, he recorded a duet with a famous fellow Bosnian singer, Hanka Paldum. The song, "Crni snijeg", was featured on her album Nek' je od srca and was covered later the same year by Serbian singer Ceca on her album Ceca 2000.

On 9 February 2006, the Bosnian television network PBSBiH announced that Hari Varešanović would represent Bosnia and Herzegovina with the song "Lejla" at the Eurovision Song Contest 2006. The announcement confirmed rumors circulating throughout the country for more than two months.

Varešanović performed a song with music written by Serbian composer Željko Joksimović and lyrics written by Bosnian writer Fahrudin Pecikoza and Serbian Dejan Ivanović. Hari Varešanović told the Bosnian newspaper Nezavisne Novine:

On 20 May 2006, Hari Varešanović and his group Hari Mata Hari reached third place at the Eurovision Song Contest 2006 held in Athens, Greece.

In 2011, Varešanović composed the music to and wrote the lyrics to Briši me, a song sung by Bosnian singer Lepa Brena for her sixteenth studio album Začarani krug. He also wrote the lyrics to her 2014 song Zaljubljeni veruju u sve.

Personal life
On 14 February 2010, Varešanović married girlfriend Jasminka Ištuk from Osijek, Croatia. They live in Sarajevo and Munich. It is the second marriage for both. Each have children from previous marriages.

Discography

Solo albums
1984 – Zlatne kočije

with Hari Mata Hari
1985 – Skini haljinu
1985 – U tvojoj kosi
1986 – Ne bi te odbranila ni cijela Jugoslavija
1988 – Ja te volim najviše na svijetu
1989 – Volio bi' da te ne volim
1990 – Strah me da te volim
1991 – Rođena si samo za mene
1994 – Ostaj mi zbogom ljubavi
1998 – Ja nemam snage da te ne volim
2001 – Baš ti lijepo stoje suze
2002 – Ružmarin
2004 – Zakon jačega
2009 – Sreća
2016 – Ćilim

References

External links

1961 births
Living people
Singers from Sarajevo
Bosniaks of Bosnia and Herzegovina
20th-century Bosnia and Herzegovina male singers
21st-century Bosnia and Herzegovina male singers
Yugoslav male singers
Hayat Production artists
Indexi Award winners
Eurovision Song Contest entrants of 2006
Eurovision Song Contest entrants for Bosnia and Herzegovina

ro:Hari Mata Hari